Manzini Sea Birds FC is a Eswatini football club based in Manzini.

History
The club was founded 1987. The Seabirds played most in the Swazi First Division and was first time promoted to the Premier League of Eswatini 2012.

In 2018, they won the First Division title to earn another top-flight promotion. Star forward Muzi Tsabedze tied for the league's top scorer and earned player of the year honors.

Stadium 
The team plays his home matches at the 5000 capacity Mavuso Sports Centre.

Current squad

Notable players 
Below is a list of notable players who have earned international caps while playing with the club.

 Victor Khoza
 Banele Mdluli
 Ndumiso Shongwe
 Muzi Tsabedze

Notable coaches 
 Van Royen Magagula (2013)
 Sihle Mavimbela (2013)
 Zenzele 'Ace' Dlamini (2014)

Youth academy 
Since 2011 the club holds with the Ishibobo Soccer Academy (ISA), an talent scouting sports academy in Manzini. ISA serves as the under-20 football team of the club. Ishibobo played his home matches on the Zakhele Sports Ground.

References

External links 
Soccerway

Football clubs in Eswatini